Marcus Green (born September 27, 1983) is a former American football defensive tackle who is a practice squad player for the New Orleans Saints of the National Football League. He was originally signed by the New York Giants as an undrafted free agent in 2006. He played college football at Ohio State.

Personal
Green's younger brother, Justin, is a cornerback for the Dallas Cowboys that played collegiately for Illinois.

References

1983 births
Living people
American football defensive tackles
New Orleans Saints players
New York Giants players
Ohio State Buckeyes football players
Seattle Seahawks players
Louisville Male High School alumni
Players of American football from Louisville, Kentucky